Shand Power Station is a coal fired station owned by SaskPower in the Canadian province of Saskatchewan, near the city of Estevan.

Description 

The Shand Power Station consists of:
one 279 net MW  unit (commissioned in 1992)
advanced  environmental controls through a LIFAC (Limestone Injection into the Furnace and reActivation of Calcium) system

The boilers are supplied by  Babcock & Wilcox and the turbines/generator are supplied by Hitachi.  The site is sized for a potential second unit in the future. A single 148 m (486 ft) smokestack is located at the plant, the tallest freestanding structure in Saskatchewan.

Shand Greenhouses 

Shand Greenhouse was built in 1991 near the power station and is part of an initiative to offset the environmental impact of burning coal.  The greenhouse grow and distribute seedlings free of charge to schools, communities and individuals for conservation and wildlife habitat projects.  The species of trees that are grown and given to the communities include: Buffaloberry, Bur Oak, Choke Cherry, Colorado Blue Spruce, Eastern Red Cedar, Green Ash, Jack Pine, Lodgepole Pine, Manitoba Maple, Pin Cherry, Plains Cottonwood, Red Alder, Red-Osier Dogwood, Saskatoon Berry, Scots Pine, Sea-Buckthorn, Shrub Willow, Siberian Crab, Siberian Larch, Trembling Aspen or White Poplar, Villosa Lilac, Western Sandcherry, White Birch or Paper Birch, Willow and Wood's Rose.

See also 
 Boundary Dam Power Station
 List of power stations in Canada
 List of generating stations in Saskatchewan
 List of tallest smokestacks in Canada

References

External links 

 SaskPower Station Description
 Shand Greenhouse

Coal-fired power stations in Saskatchewan
Estevan No. 5, Saskatchewan
SaskPower